Berriozar is a town located in the province of Navarre, in the autonomous community of Navarre, in the North of Spain. It is 6 km from Pamplona, forming part of Pamplona's metropolitan area. Berriozar's population in 2013 was 9.605 people.

Berriozar became an independent municipality when it segregated from the council with its name by Foral Decree 87/1991, of March 14, published in the official BON 34/1991.

References

External links
 BERRIOZAR in the Bernardo Estornés Lasa - Auñamendi Encyclopedia (Euskomedia Fundazioa) Information available in Spanish

Municipalities in Navarre